"Prophecy" is the eighth single released by the J-pop singer, Mami Kawada, released on November 18, 2009. The title track will be used as the opening theme for Shakugan no Shana S, an OVA of the anime series Shakugan no Shana. Overall, this will be Kawada's fifth tie-in with the said anime series.

The single came in a limited CD+DVD edition (GNCV-0007) and a regular edition (GNCV-0008). The DVD contains the promotional video for "Prophecy".

The single peaked at #34 in the Oricon weeklies charting for only three weeks making this Kawada's least successful single to date.

Track listing 
Prophecy
Lyrics: Mami Kawada
Composition/Arrangement: Tomoyuki Nakazawa, Takeshi Ozaki
a frame
Lyrics: Mami Kawada
Composition/Arrangement: Tomoyuki Nakazawa, Takeshi Ozaki
Prophecy -instrumental-
a frame -instrumental-

Sales trajectory

References

2009 singles
2009 songs
Mami Kawada songs
Shakugan no Shana songs
Songs with lyrics by Mami Kawada
Song recordings produced by I've Sound